Costel Danculea (born 3 March 1985) is a Romanian judoka.

Achievements

External links
 

1985 births
Living people
Romanian male judoka
Place of birth missing (living people)